Your Memorial was an American metalcore band from Hennepin County, Minnesota. The group is currently under contract with Facedown Records. Its debut studio album, Seasons, was released in 2008. In 2010, the band released its second studio album, Atonement. Its third studio album, Redirect, was released in 2012. On May 9 in 2017 the band announced that they were disbanding.

History
In 2008 the band released Seasons. This attracted the attention of Facedown Records, which signed the band before the release of Atonement in 2010. In 2012, the band released its second studio album, Redirect.  The album also had success on two Billboard charts: Christian Albums and Heatseekers Albums. In 2017, the band announced they would disband but would release a self titled EP, recorded with Ryan Leitru (Nothing Left, ex-For Today), and that it would be released on November 10, 2017.

Musical style
Music critics have placed the band's compositions into various genres, including soft mathcore, melodic hardcore, progressive metal, and the harder subsets crossover thrash, hardcore punk, metalcore, and screamo.  Others have characterized the group as an avant-garde metal band that utilizes some post-hardcore elements. The band itself regards its music as Christian metal for its sacred elements and heavy metal for the holistic, encompassing totality of its sound.

Members
Previous members
Josh - lead vocals
Joel Eckerson - bass
Rayyan - guitar
Current members
 Blake Suddath – lead vocals
 Mike "Skip" Helms – bass
 Tommy Weigel – drums
 Willy Weigel – lead guitar

Discography

Studio albums

EPs

References

2008 establishments in Minnesota
American Christian metal musical groups
Christian rock groups from Minnesota
Facedown Records artists
Musical groups established in 2008
Musical groups disestablished in 2017
Metalcore musical groups from Minnesota